Chrysophyllum wilsonii is a tree in the family Sapotaceae, native to Brazil.

Description
Fascicles feature up to ten yellow-green flowers.

Distribution and habitat
Chrysophyllum wilsonii is endemic to Brazil, where it is confined to the forest reserves of the Biological Dynamics of Forest Fragments Project near Manaus, in Amazonas state.

Conservation
Chrysophyllum wilsonii has been assessed as endangered on the IUCN Red List. It is threatened by population growth in the area, leading to residential development in its habitat. It is also threatened by deforestation for cattle farming. Water pollution by heavy metals from urban landfills poses a threat to the species.

References

wilsonii
Flora of North Brazil
Plants described in 2006